The Cathedral of Praise (COP) is a Full Gospel, Christ-centered megachurch based in Manila, Philippines. COP is headed by Pastors David and Beverley Sumrall.

History 
Founded in 1954, formerly Manila Bethel Temple, The Cathedral of Praise is a Christian church founded in 1954 by Ptr. Lester Sumrall. Currently staffed by Pastors David and Beverley Sumrall, COP operates a Main Campus along Taft Avenue, Manila, an East Campus in Pioneer Centre, Pasig, a South Campus at Versailles, Las Piñas and a North Campus along Commonwealth Ave., Quezon City.

The Cathedral of Praise, formerly Manila Bethel Temple, was founded in 1954 by Dr. Lester Sumrall.  Under the leadership of Dr. David Sumrall and his wife Bev, who moved to Manila in 1989, the Church had grown to a membership of 15,000, with a large staff including 90 full-time, paid, evangelists engaged in attracting others in the predominantly Roman Catholic Philippines to evangelical Christianity.

Cathedral of Praise is currently expanding. In their website, they mentioned their plan to plant 200 churches in 20 years.

 After nearly three decades of building and finishing the construction costs of the 8,000-seat fully air-conditioned state-of-the-art auditorium, the COP complex and congregational facilities continue to expand not only in the main campus but also in key areas of the metro. Each campus provides a spacious, comfortable and technically well-equipped sanctuary to house regular worship services and special ministry events. Aside from the Manila Campus, the COP East Campus over at the Pioneer Centre in Mandaluyong, South Campus located at the Versailles Place in Las Piñas, and the newly built North Campus in Commonwealth, Quezon City, serve members residing in those areas. In the works are the plans to build for the South Campus its own facilities and over-all maintenance and specific upgrades of portions of the Main Campus are also underway.
Cathedral of Praise have aired in different TV Networks. Cathedral of Praise with David Sumrall started its airing at ABS-CBN Channel 2 from the year 1986 to 1992. Then it was later moved to the reopened ABC Channel 5 from 1992 to 1995 GMA Channel 7 year 1995 and ended its airing in the year 2002. Followed by its airing at RPN Channel 9 from the same year until 2005 and on DZRH TV from 2022 to present.

On January 29, 2017, Cathedral of Praise formally launched its own radio station, COP Bible Radio, DZBR 531 kHz on the AM band, from Tanauan, Batangas. DZBR broadcasts gospel-related programs from 5:00 AM to 12:00 MN. daily on traditional AM radio and 24/7 via internet streaming. The station can be heard in the whole Batangas, and some parts of Calabarzon and Metro Manila. On February 23, DZBR started its test broadcast.

Campuses 

Cathedral of Praise is a multisite church and has four main worship services located throughout the metro.

Main Campus 

The Main Campus of COP is located in Taft Avenue, Ermita, Manila. It serves as the headquarters of the church. It contains the Kid's Tower, Serenity Columbarium, the Bible/Music College, Connect Central, a cry room, a medical clinic, a bookstore, an audio-visual room, the COP Cafe, several prayer rooms and church offices. The residing Campus Pastor for COP Main Campus is Pastora Bheng Peralta and with campus speaker, Pastor Rafael Manalo.

North Campus 

COP North Campus is located in 2nd Floor of Shopking, Doña Carmen at the Commonwealth Ave, Quezon City, Metro Manila. The residing Campus Pastor and speaker for COP North Campus is Pastora Beng Peralta.

East Campus 

COP East Campus is located in Pioneer Center along Pioneer street in Pasig. It previously held its Sunday worship services in Shangri-La Mall until July 2014. The current residing Campus Pastor and Speaker is Pastora Rose Delos Reyes.

South Campus 

The COP South Campus is located along Versailles-Daang Hari Road in Las Piñas. It previously held its services on Bellevue Hotel in Alabang, Muntinlupa until 2007. In November 2010, it was announced that the South Campus will transfer to the Festival Mall, but the transfer was cancelled. They also announced another transfer on April 15, 2012, to the West Service Road in Muntinlupa. However, COP South Campus transferred at its present site on its own building. The current residing Campus Pastor is Pastora Oyin Galvan and Pastora Alisha Sumrall-Lozano as Campus Speaker.

Branches

See also 
 DZBR 531 Bible Radio

References

External links 

 Cathedral of Praise – Official website
 Cathedral of Praise Facebook Page
 Cathedral of Praise TV
 Cathedral of Praise Radio

Christian organizations established in 1954
Evangelical megachurches in the Philippines
Christian denominations in Asia
Pentecostal denominations
20th-century Pentecostal church buildings
Churches in Manila
Churches in Metro Manila
20th-century religious buildings and structures in the Philippines